Paranoia: A True Story is the eleventh mixtape by American rapper Dave East. It was released on August 18, 2017, by Def Jam Recordings, Mass Appeal Records and From The Dirt Records. The mixtape lead single, "Perfect", was released on July 28, 2017. The mixtape features guest appearances from Nas, Jeezy, Wiz Khalifa, French Montana and Chris Brown.

Background
Dave East announced the album's release date on August 2, 2017 via Instagram. Nearly a week later, he unveiled the album's official cover art. Just two days before the album's release, the tracklist was revealed.

Track listing
Credits adapted from iTunes and Tidal.

Notes
  signifies a co-producer
  signifies an additional producer
 "Jazzy" features additional vocals from Jazzy Amra
 "Found a Way" features additional vocals from D'anna Stewart
 "Kairi Speaks" features additional vocals from Kairi Brewster
 "Have You Ever" features background vocals from Katrina Russ

Charts

References

2017 EPs
Dave East albums
Albums produced by Harry Fraud
Def Jam Recordings EPs
Mass Appeal Records albums